In mathematics, the Lah numbers, discovered by Ivo Lah in 1954, are coefficients expressing rising factorials in terms of falling factorials.

Unsigned Lah numbers have an interesting meaning in combinatorics: they count the number of ways a set of n elements can be partitioned into k nonempty linearly ordered subsets. Lah numbers are related to Stirling numbers.

Unsigned Lah numbers :

Signed Lah numbers :

L(n, 1) is always n!; in the interpretation above, the only partition of {1, 2, 3} into 1 set can have its set ordered in 6 ways:

{(1, 2, 3)}, {(1, 3, 2)}, {(2, 1, 3)}, {(2, 3, 1)}, {(3, 1, 2)} or {(3, 2, 1)}

L(3, 2) corresponds to the 6 partitions with two ordered parts:

{(1), (2, 3)}, {(1), (3, 2)}, {(2), (1, 3)}, {(2), (3, 1)}, {(3), (1, 2)} or {(3), (2, 1)}

L(n, n) is always 1 since, e.g., partitioning {1, 2, 3} into 3 non-empty subsets results in subsets of length 1.

{(1), (2), (3)}

Adapting the Karamata–Knuth notation for Stirling numbers, it has been proposed to use the following alternative notation for Lah numbers:

Table of values
Below is a table of values for the Lah numbers:

Rising and falling factorials

Let  represent the rising factorial  and let  represent the falling factorial .

Then  and 

For example, 

and

Compare the third row of the table of values.

Identities and relations

So we have

 where ,  for all

Exponential generating function

Ordinary generating function

Practical application 
In recent years, Lah numbers have been used in steganography for hiding data in images. Compared to alternatives such as DCT, DFT and DWT, it has lower complexity——of calculation of their integer coefficients.
The Lah and Laguerre transforms naturally arise in the perturbative description of the chromatic dispersion

. In Lah-Laguerre optics, such an approach tremendously speeds up optimization problems.

See also 
 Stirling numbers
 Pascal matrix

References 

Factorial and binomial topics
Integer sequences
Triangles of numbers